DraftKings is an American daily fantasy sports contest and sports betting company. The company allows users to enter daily and weekly fantasy sports–related contests and win money based on individual player performances in five major American sports (the MLB, the NHL, the NFL, the NBA and the PGA), Premier League and UEFA Champions League football, NASCAR auto racing, Canadian Football League, the XFL, mixed martial arts (MMA), Tennis, All Elite Wrestling (AEW), and WWE.

DraftKings launched DraftKings Sportsbook in New Jersey. Since launching in New Jersey, DraftKings has opened mobile sports betting operations in Connecticut, Indiana, Pennsylvania, West Virginia and New Hampshire on December 30, 2019 after reaching contract with the New Hampshire Lottery. 

As of April 2016, the majority of U.S. states consider fantasy sports (including daily fantasy sports) a game of skill, rather than gambling. In November 2016, FanDuel and DraftKings, the two largest companies in the daily fantasy sports industry, reached an agreement to merge. However, the merger was terminated in July 2017-- blocked by the Federal Trade Commission to prevent potential monopoly, as the combined company would have controlled 90 percent of the market for daily fantasy sports. As of July 2017, DraftKings had eight million users.

DraftKings became a publicly traded company through a reverse merger with SBTech, a Bulgarian technology company, and special-purpose acquisition company Diamond Eagle Acquisition Corp in April 2020.

History 

DraftKings was established in 2012 by Jason Robins, Matthew Kalish, and Paul Liberman, former Vistaprint employees. The company initially operated out of Liberman's house. The company's first product was a one-on-one baseball competition, launched to coincide with Major League Baseball's opening day in 2012.

In April 2013, Major League Baseball invested in DraftKings, becoming the first US professional sports organization to invest in daily fantasy sports. The investment was not disclosed at the time.

In February 2014, it was reported that the company awarded $50 million in prizes in 2013 to players in weekly fantasy football, daily fantasy baseball, daily fantasy basketball and daily fantasy hockey. The company also reported 50,000 active daily users and as many as one million registered players.

In July 2014, it announced the acquisition of the third largest company, rival DraftStreet, owned at the time by New York media company IAC. The acquisition reportedly increased DraftKings' user base by 50%. The company announced it would keep the DraftStreet NY office open and retain some employees.

In August 2014, the company announced $41 million in funding from a variety of investors, including The Raine Group, as well as existing investors Redpoint Ventures, GGV Capital, and Accomplice. The company also announced that it was acquiring the assets of Somerville, MA, competitor StarStreet.

In November 2014, DraftKings reached a two-year deal to become the official daily fantasy sports service of the National Hockey League. The deal included sponsorships of video features and other content across the NHL's digital outlets, co-branded free games with fan-oriented prizes, and in-venue ad placements during marquee NHL events. Yahoo! Sports remained the league's official season-length fantasy sports provider.

In April 2015, DraftKings reached a similar deal with Major League Baseball. The agreement allowed DraftKings to offer co-branded MLB daily fantasy games and extend its relationships with individual MLB clubs to offer in-stadium fantasy-related experiences. The company also announced it had received $304 million in users' entry fees in 2014.

In July 2015, DraftKings entered into a three-year advertising deal with ESPN Inc. valued at $250 million. This deal included "integration" of the service within ESPN's television and digital content, and having exclusivity in advertising DFS services on its networks beginning in January 2016.

Also in July 2015, DraftKings announced a round of funding totaling $300 million, led by Fox Sports, along with the Kraft Group, owners of the New England Patriots, and Boston financial giant Wellington Management. The agreement included a condition stating that DraftKings would spend $250 million on advertising with Fox Sports over the next three years. Due to the acquisition of 21st Century Fox by Disney in March 2019, Fox's stake is now owned by The Walt Disney Company.

In August 2015, DraftKings announced that it had been granted a license by the Gambling Commission to operate pool wagering services in the United Kingdom and that it planned to open an office in London. The company also hired Jeffrey Haas, a veteran of the online poker industry, to serve as Chief International Officer to lead the company's international expansion. DraftKings officially launched in the UK on February 5, 2016, with daily fantasy soccer. As part of the launch, DraftKings enhanced its handling of soccer on the platform to appeal to the local audience. The following year, DraftKings was subsequently awarded a controlled skill games license in Malta, which would allow the service to expand into any European Union country that allows gambling services to operate under licensing from another EU country, such as Germany.

On October 5, 2015, an article in The New York Times indicated that an employee at DraftKings admitted to inadvertently releasing data before the start of week three's NFL football games. That same employee had won $350,000 on rival fantasy site FanDuel the same week. An internal review concluded the employee obtained the data after lineups were locked and couldn't have used that data for an unfair advantage. Both DraftKings and FanDuel released statements saying that "Nothing is more important... than the integrity of the games we offer to our customers," and they would work with the entire fantasy sports industry "so that fans everywhere can continue to enjoy and trust the games they love." The following day, New York Attorney General Eric Schneiderman opened an inquiry into DraftKings and FanDuel, asking each site for a range of internal data and details on how they prevent fraud. ESPN announced on October 6 that they would no longer be running segments sponsored by DraftKings, though paid DraftKings advertisements would continue.

In February 2016, ESPN backed out of its advertising deal with DraftKings due to the legal uncertainties surrounding the service.

On May 2, 2016 attorney general Lawrence Wasden banned DraftKings and FanDuel from operating in Idaho, calling them illegal gambling.  

On November 18, 2016, DraftKings and FanDuel announced their intent to merge. The combined company would serve over five million users. On June 19, 2017, the Federal Trade Commission (FTC) announced that it would seek a preliminary injunction to block the proposed merger. The FTC felt that the proposed transaction would give the combined company 90% of the U.S. DFS market, which is considered to be a monopoly position. On July 13, 2017, the merger was officially called off due to the threat of litigation from the FTC.

In September 2017, DraftKings and FanDuel each paid $1.3 million to settle with the Massachusetts Attorney General's office over allegations of unfair and deceptive practices by the companies prior to 2016.

In 2021, Draftkings agreed to pay at least $50 million over a three-year period to distribute a sports and pop-culture podcast hosted by Dan Le Batard. The agreement marks the first major licensing deal struck by Meadowlark Media, founded by Le Batard. The podcast averages around 10 to 12 million downloads monthly. As of July 2021, DraftKings reached a market capitalization of $20.64 billion.

In December 2021, DraftKings was sued by Colossus Bets over patent infringement. Colossus claimed DraftKings infringed seven patents covering sports betting and gaming products with a cash-out feature.

In May 2022, it was announced that DraftKings had acquired the online casino and sports betting operator, Golden Nugget Online Gaming.

Expansion into sports betting in the U.S. 
In May 2018, the Professional and Amateur Sports Protection Act of 1992 was declared unconstitutional by the Supreme Court of the United States, allowing states outside of Nevada to legalize sports betting. In August 2018, DraftKings launched its first legal online sportsbook in New Jersey. Since launching in New Jersey, DraftKings has opened sports betting operations in New York, West Virginia, Indiana, Iowa, New Hampshire, Massachusetts and Mississippi.

In April 2020, DraftKings completed a reverse merger valued at $3.3 billion that made it a publicly traded company. The merger involved Diamond Eagle Acquisition Corp., a special-purpose acquisition company that went public in May 2019, as well as SBTech Global Ltd., a Europe-based company providing technology solutions for sports betting businesses. The combined company keeps both DraftKings' name and its executive management. On April 24, 2020, the company's shares started trading on the Nasdaq stock exchange under the ticker symbol "DKNG". Hindenburg Research later published a report alleging that SBTech, which accounted for around 25% of DraftKing's revenue at the SPAC consummation, has ties to organized crime in Bulgaria and illegal gambling around the world.

In September 2020, retired NBA player Michael Jordan became an investor and board advisor at DraftKings.

References

External links 
 

Browser-based game websites
Fantasy sports websites
Daily fantasy sports
Companies based in Boston
2012 establishments in Massachusetts
American companies established in 2012
Internet properties established in 2012
Sports apps
Sports betting
Companies listed on the Nasdaq
Special-purpose acquisition companies